The  was a class of eight cruisers of the Royal Navy. They were envisaged from 1883 onwards by Admiral Sir Astley Cooper Key to replace existing sloops as ancillaries for working with the British Fleet and also for trade protection; a total of twenty such ships were planned by him, but only eight were built. Six ships were ordered under the 1884 Programme and built by J & G Thomson at Clydebank in Glasgow. A further two ships were ordered under the 1885 Programme, and these were built at the Devonport Dockyard with all ships completed between 1887 and 1888. These ships mainly served in the British Empire's foreign fleets being on various stations throughout the north Atlantic, Pacific, and Indian oceans. Throughout their careers they were involved in a number of local conflicts including the Anglo-Zanzibar War, First Sino-Japanese War, and the Boxer Rebellion.

Design 

These third class cruisers of the Royal Navy were also known as torpedo cruisers. They were designed to meet and defeat smaller torpedo boats while also being able to strike larger vessels with their own torpedoes. To this end they filled the role that would be soon taken over by early destroyer designs.

The Archer class were enlarged derivatives of the earlier . They carried their six 6-inch guns in single mounts, three on each beam, mounted on sponsons with one pair immediately aft of the foremast, one pair between the single funnel and the mainmast, and one pair immediately forward of the mizen mast. The ships were built with three masts (for which sails were provided), but the mainmast was subsequently removed from most ships during refits between 1897 and 1900. Eventually eight torpedo tubes were fitted, with a total of 12 torpedoes carried.

Cost 

The six ships of the 1884 Programme were all contracted to Thomson as a fixed price of £55,916 each, plus £31,667 each for machinery. The two further vessels were built at Devonport Dockyard at a cost of £60,606 each for the hulls; their machinery was contracted from Harland and Wolff at a cost of £31,000 each.

Ships

Fate 

On 10 November 1890,  was caught in heavy storm off the northwest coast of Spain. The ship attempted to reach shelter but ran aground near Camariñas on the treacherous Costa da Morte of Galicia. All but three of her crew were killed. The resulting court martial investigating the loss of Serpent concluded that the ship had been lost as a result of a navigation error.

The seven other ships of the Archer class would quickly lose their usefulness to the Royal Navy as shipbuilding and design moved at a rapid pace around the turn of the century. All seven ships would be sold for scrap in 1905 and 1906.

Citations

References 

Ship classes of the Royal Navy
Victorian-era cruisers of the United Kingdom
Archer-class cruisers
Cruiser classes